Holi Ayee Re is a 1970 Indian Bollywood romance film directed by Harsukh Jagneshwar Bhatt. The film stars Balraj Sahani, Premendra, Rehman, Rajendra Nath, Kanhaiyalal, Shatrughan Sinha and Mala Sinha.

Cast
Shatrughan Sinha .... Inspector Suresh 
Mala Sinha ... Suhagi and Hemlata
Balraj Sahni .... Thakur Mangal Singh
Rehman .... Thakur Gopal Singh 
Premendra (actor) Parashar, Dr Prakash
Kumud Chuggani   ... Sunita
Rajendra Nath   ... Sampat
Kanhaiyalal ... Anokhe Lal
Jankidas   
Dulari   
Praveen Paul
Zulfiqar Ali

Soundtrack
The music of this movie was composed by Kalyanji–Anandji. "Meri Tamannaon Ki Taqdeer Tum" by Mukesh was one of the movie's best known songs.

References

External links
 Holi Songs
 

1970 films
1970s Hindi-language films
1970s romance films
Films scored by Kalyanji Anandji
Indian romance films
Hindi-language romance films